Adam Zamoyski (born 11 January 1949) is a British historian and author.

Personal life
Born in New York City in 1949, Adam Stefan Zamoyski was brought up in England and educated at St Philip's Preparatory School, The Queen's College, Oxford, where he read History and Modern Languages (BA Hons. 1970, MA Hons 1974).  

Zamoyski has dual Polish-British nationality and speaks English, Polish, French, Italian and Russian. His parents, Count Stefan Zamoyski (1904–1976) and Princess Elizabeth Czartoryska (1905–1989), left their homeland when it was invaded by Germany and Russia in 1939. When the Soviets took power at end of World War II, they found themselves stranded in the West, eventually settling in London.

Zamoyski lives in London with his wife, the painter Emma Sergeant. He first visited Poland in the 1960s and now has a second home in an area of great biodiversity near Zamość, where he has planted over a thousand trees and restored a number of traditional wooden cottages.

Career
Zamoyski is a freelance historian and author, with numerous books including his history of Poland, The Polish Way, and Moscow 1812: Napoleon's Fatal March, his account of Napoleon's invasion of Russia in 1812. His biography of Frédéric Chopin, Chopin. Prince of the Romantics, was serialised as the 'Book of the Week' on BBC Radio 4 in 2012. His books have been translated into more than a dozen languages. 

Zamoyski has lectured across Europe, the US and Australia, as well as featuring in television and radio broadcasts. Various debates in which he has taken part are accessible online.

Books
 
 
 
 
 
 
 
 
 
 
 
 
 
 
 
 
 

Most of Zamoyski's books are available as e-books.

Contributions and other publications
 

 
 Nine entries by Zamoyski in Grove Art Online, London 1996.
 
 
 
 From 2003 to 2019 Zamoyski wrote over a dozen articles for The Spectator.

See also
List of Polish people

References

External links
 

1949 births
Living people
Alumni of The Queen's College, Oxford
English people of Polish descent
Historians of Polish descent
Counts of Poland
Adam
People educated at Downside School
Knights of Malta
Fellows of the Royal Society of Literature
American emigrants to England
Historians of the Napoleonic Wars
Writers from New York City
American people of Polish descent
20th-century British historians
Polish male non-fiction writers
 Naturalized citizens of Poland
 Historians of Poland
Chopin scholars